Ejiro Amos Tafiri is a Nigerian fashion designer. She is the originator of Ejiro Amos Tafiri (E.A.T) brand which was established to meet the fashion needs of a modern woman. It is one of the most sustainable, fast grown brands for the African woman who loves fluid, elegant garments heroing a seamless blend of prints, textures and influences birthing timeless traditional glamorous pieces.

From starting out of a room in her parents' home to running multiple outlets, labels and mentoring/training institute, She has successfully pushed her brand to become a top and foremost brand for the African woman as well as a fashion industry giant.

Early life and career
Ejiro Amos-Tafiri was born in the city of Lagos. Her love for fashion started at the age of three through the influence of her grandmother who was then her tailor.  

After elementary and high school, She went on to Yaba College of Technology where she studied Fashion Design and Clothing Technology even though she was expected to study medicine. She eventually graduated summa cum laude, obtaining a Distinction Grade as well as a Best Student award.

However, the Ejiro Amos Tafiri brand was launched in March 2010 after garnering experience from her internship stints and work experience at Out of Africa, Zizi Ethnic Clothing and Tiffany Amber where she honed her technical, creative and social skills, the garnered training proved invaluable.

Ejiro Amos-Tafiri can be credited with contributions, either in the capacity of a designer or ambassador to works with Samsung, Vlisco, Belvedere, British Council,  Heineken, Daviva, Paris Fashion Week, Lagos Design Fashion Week (LFDW) to mention a few

Consistency paved way for her as an innovative author and a notable speaker on entrepreneurship platforms and awarded a number of accolades such as the Fashion film of the Year Of the City People Fashion and beauty Awards in 2013, the Glam and Essence fastest Growing fashion brand in 2014, Outstanding Emerging Designer at the Heineken LFDW awards in 2015, the Designer of the year at the City People Fashion & Beauty Awards in 2015, the Rhoda Michaels Flame Leadership Awards in 2016 and the Icon of Hope award at the ADFWNG awards in 2018 among others.

References
https://theseptemberstandard.com/byge-oru-ejiro-amos-tafiris-amvca-nomination-is-a-win-for-fashion-film/

https://m1.fluidreview.com/blog/2015/feb/01/ejiro-amos-tafiri/

https://m1.fluidreview.com/media/awssmapply/smapply/reviewroom/17365/file_attachments/Kenya_Fashion_Week.html

https://m1.fluidreview.com/media/awssmapply/smapply/reviewroom/17365/file_attachments/VLISCO_ambassador.html

https://m1.fluidreview.com/media/awssmapply/smapply/reviewroom/17365/file_attachments/Women_Entrepreneurs.html

Nigerian women fashion designers

Living people
Year of birth missing (living people)